Kottakkal Madhu (born 26 October 1968) is a prominent Kathakali Musician, Playback singer and Composer from Kottakkal, Kerala, India who specializes in Kathakali music. He works as kathakali music instructor in PSV Natyasangham(c/o Arya Vaidya Sala, Kottakkal). He received the Kerala Sangeetha Nataka Akademi Award in 2016.

References

External links
 Cyberkerala – Kottakkal Madhu
 
 
 Invis Multimedia.com – Vocal: Kottakkal Madhu
 List of kathakalipadams sung by Madhu from kathakalipadam.com: A  comprehensive database for kathakali music with streaming

People from Malappuram district
Living people
1968 births
Singers from Kerala
21st-century Indian male classical singers
20th-century Indian male classical singers
Recipients of the Kerala Sangeetha Nataka Akademi Award